The 8th congressional district of Tennessee is a congressional district in West Tennessee. It has been represented by Republican David Kustoff since January 2017.

Current boundaries
The district is located in West Tennessee. It borders Kentucky to the north, Arkansas and Missouri to the west, and Mississippi to the south.

It is currently composed of the following counties: Carroll, Chester, Crockett, Dyer, Fayette, Gibson, Hardeman, Hardin, Haywood, Henderson, Henry, Lake, Lauderdale, Madison, McNairy, Obion, Tipton, and Weakley. It also contains a large piece of Shelby County, including the eastern part of Memphis, half of Tipton County, and a small piece of Benton.

Characteristics
The district appears rural on a map, but the bulk of its vote is cast in the suburban and exurban areas around Memphis, such as Germantown, Bartlett, and Collierville, as well as Fayette and Tipton counties. This area boasts some of the highest median incomes in the state.

The rest of the district is composed mostly of small towns and farming communities. The district already had a strong social conservative tint which grew even more pronounced when eastern Memphis was added to the district; many of the state's most politically active churches are located here.

According to the 2010 census, the five largest cities located mostly with the district are: Jackson (65,211), Bartlett (54,613), Collierville (43,965), Germantown (38,844), and Dyersburg (17,145).

Election results from presidential races 
Results Under Old Lines (2013-2023)

History
Districts similar to today's 8th (composing of rural areas in northwest Tennessee) have been in place since Reconstruction.

During the early 20th century, most of northwest Tennessee was represented by Democrats Finis J. Garrett (1905 to 1929) and Jere Cooper (1929 to 1957). Before 1933, the district was numbered as the 9th; it was numbered as the 9th again from 1943 to 1953. Cooper was succeeded by Fats Everett, who served until his death in early 1969.

The district was pushed into Memphis' northern suburbs in 1967 due to a re-districting caused by the Baker v. Carr ruling.

Following Everett's death in 1969, former Tennessee Commissioner of Agriculture Ed Jones won a special election for the balance of his term. Jones served the area in Congress for just under twenty years until his retirement in 1989. Upon Jones' retirement, State Senator John S. Tanner succeeded him. Following eleven terms (22 years) in Congress, Tanner retired.

For most of the 20th century, the 8th was a classic Yellow Dog Democrat district. The area's Democrats were nowhere near as liberal as their counterparts in Nashville and Memphis, and the area's voters were willing to split their tickets in national elections from the 1960s onward. However, the GOP was almost nonexistent at the state and local level, with Republicans only fielding "sacrificial lamb" candidates on the few times they fielded candidates at all.

However, Republicans gradually began eroding the Democratic advantage at the turn of the century. It was swept up in the statewide Republican wave of 2008, with Republicans capturing most of the district's seats in the Tennessee General Assembly. This culminated in 2011, when Republican businessman Stephen Fincher defeated Democratic state senator Roy Herron in a landslide, taking 58 percent of the vote to Herron's 39 percent. It marked the first time since Reconstruction that a Republican had represented northwest Tennessee. Since then, no Democrat has managed even 40 percent of the vote.

Following the 2010 census, the district lost its remaining territory in Middle Tennessee, meaning it was entirely within West Tennessee for the first time since 1968. In the same census, it picked up the 7th's share of Shelby County, meaning that since 2012, any area of Shelby County that is not in the 9th is in the 8th. The 8th also absorbed all of Fayette County. The eastern Memphis suburbs, particularly eastern Shelby County, are the most Republican areas of the state outside of East Tennessee. Their addition gave the 8th a character similar to the 7th; it is now the most Republican district in the state outside East Tennessee and one of the most Republican districts in the South.

In 2016, Fincher retired and was succeeded by Republican David Kustoff, a Germantown resident and former United States Attorney.

List of members representing the district

Historical district boundaries

See also

Tennessee's congressional districts
List of United States congressional districts

References

 Congressional Biographical Directory of the United States 1774–present

08